AB-FUBICA is a drug that acts as a potent agonist for the cannabinoid receptors, with EC50 values of 21 nM at CB1 and 15 nM at CB2.

See also 
 AB-FUBINACA
 ADB-FUBICA

References 

Cannabinoids
Designer drugs
Fluoroarenes
Indolecarboxamides